Appert Frères was a French company specializing in glassware, active from 1832 to 1947. 

The company was founded in 1832  in Clichy-la-Garenne by Louis-Adrien Appert  as the "Maison Appert".  In 1858 it took the name "Appert et Fils" when the founder's two sons, Adrien-Antoine  and Léon-Alfred Appert , became involved. In 1865 Louis-Adrien withdrew from glassmaking and the company was renamed "Appert Frères".

The original business supplied raw materials such as coloured crystals and enamel for smaller glass products.  Much of the activity was selling semi-finished products to finishing workshops. The Appert brothers started to work with and sell finished products on behalf of glass designers.  Their best known client was Eugène Rousseau who worked in the Japonism style.

Léon-Alfred Appert trained at the École Centrale Paris and introduced a major innovation to the world of glassblowing with the use of compressed air. Although he managed to mechanize the work of the glass blower, the technique was not widely taken up because of the high cost of investment.

Léon-Alfred's son Leopold Antonin  succeeded him in the running of the business and was in turn succeeded by his brother Maurice-Adrien .  The company was dissolved in 1947.

Gallery

References

External links

Article on Léon-Alfred Appert by Anne-Laure Carré

Defunct glassmaking companies